Luicidal is the debut album by the American punk rock band Luicidal, released on October 14, 2014.

Overview
Luicidal features multiple musicians including three of the four members of the Join the Army era Suicidal Tendencies lineup (Louiche Mayorga, R.J. Herrera and Rocky George) as well as Grant Estes and Amery Smith, who played guitar and drums respectively on Suicidal Tendencies' 1983 self-titled debut album. Mike Muir is the only original member of Suicidal Tendencies who does not perform on the album. Luicidal also features guest vocals by H.R. (Bad Brains), Dale Henderson (Beowülf) and Keven Guercio (No Mercy).

Reception
Luicidal has received mostly positive reviews. Rich Dodgin from All About The Rock said, "This is an album of old school punk rock, Venice Beach style, and an album that I'm going to have on repeat play for a long time to come."

Track listing

Personnel
Luicidal
 Mando Ochoa – vocals
 Marty Ramirez – guitar
 Louiche Mayorga – bass
 R.J. Herrera – drums

Additional personnel
 Dale Henderson - vocals
 Keven Guercio - vocals
 H.R. - vocals
 Rocky George - guitar
 Grant Estes - guitar
 Amery Smith - drums

References

Luicidal albums
2014 debut albums